The Duchy of Castro was a fiefdom in central Italy formed in 1537 from a small strip of land on what is now Lazio's border with Tuscany, centred on Castro, a fortified city on a tufa cliff overlooking the Fiora River which was its capital and ducal residence. While technically a vassal state of the Papal States, it enjoyed de facto independence under the rule of the House of Farnese until 1649, when it was subsumed back into the Papal States and administered by the House of Stampa di Ferentino.

The title of Duke of Castro has been held since the late 1860s by the claimant to the headship of the House of Bourbon-Two Sicilies, since the Kingdom of the Two Sicilies was annexed to the newborn Kingdom of Italy. Prince Carlo, Duke of Castro currently holds the tile.

It was created a duchy by Pope Paul III (1534–1549) in the bull Videlicet immeriti on 31 October 1537, with his son Pier Luigi Farnese and his firstborn male heirs as its dukes. It lasted approximately 112 years and was eclipsed by the Farnese's possessions in Parma. It stretched from the Tyrrhenian Sea to the Lago di Bolsena, in the strip of land bounded by the river Marta and the river Fiora, stretching back to the Olpeta stream and the lago di Mezzano, from which the Olpeta flows. The duchy of Latera and county of Ronciglione were annexed to it.

Wars of Castro

List of Dukes of Castro
1537-1545: Pier Luigi Farnese
1545-1547: Ottavio Farnese
1547-1553: Orazio Farnese
1553-1586: Ottavio Farnese
1586-1592: Alexander Farnese
1592-1622: Ranuccio I Farnese
1622-1646: Odoardo Farnese
1646-1649: Ranuccio II Farnese

References

 
1537 establishments in the Papal States
1649 disestablishments
Castro, Duchy of
Papal States
States and territories established in 1537
House of Farnese
Former monarchies of Europe
Former duchies